"If You Wanna Get To Heaven" is a single by the Ozark Mountain Daredevils from their 1973 album The Ozark Mountain Daredevils. This was the band's debut single and also the first of their two Top 40 hits reaching #25 on the Billboard Hot 100.   The song sold about 500,000 copies.

Track listing
"If You Wanna Get to Heaven" 3:04
"Spaceship Orion" 3:11

Background

Cover versions
 Hank Williams, Jr. covered the song on his 1982 album, High Notes.
The song was covered by Jeff Carson on his 1997 album Butterfly Kisses. 
 In 2007, the song was covered by Saliva lead singer Josey Scott for the movie The Dukes of Hazzard: The Beginning. It is heard in the background when The General Lee is being pulled out of the water and being restored.

Popular culture
Included in Grand Theft Auto V on the radio station Rebel Radio, the song also served as the opening music to the 1991 PBS documentary "Dancing Outlaw", which profiled the life of legendary West Virginia "Mountain Dancer" Jesco White.

References

1973 singles
Songs written by Steve Cash
A&M Records singles
1973 songs
The Ozark Mountain Daredevils songs